Thesprotia maculata, the grass mantis, is a species of mantis found in Bolivia and Brazil.

References

maculata
Mantodea of South America
Fauna of Bolivia
Insects of Brazil
Insects of South America
Insects described in 1894